Meyenburg is a town in the district of Prignitz, in Brandenburg, Germany. It is situated 23 km northwest of Wittstock, and 18 km northeast of Pritzwalk. The town contains Meyenburg Castle.

Demography

References

Localities in Prignitz